The 2018–19 season was 28th consecutive season in the top Ukrainian football league for Dynamo Kyiv. Dynamo competed in Premier League, Ukrainian Cup, UEFA Champions League, UEFA Europa League and 2018 Ukrainian Super Cup.

Players

Squad information

Transfers

In

Out

Pre-season and friendlies

Competitions

Overall

Ukrainian Premier League

League table

Results summary

Results by round

Matches

Ukrainian Cup

Ukrainian Super Cup

UEFA Champions League

Third qualifying round

Play-off round

Europa League

Group stage

Knockout phase

Round of 32

Round of 16

Statistics

Appearances and goals

|-
! colspan=16 style=background:#dcdcdc; text-align:center| Goalkeepers

|-
! colspan=16 style=background:#dcdcdc; text-align:center| Defenders

|-
! colspan=16 style=background:#dcdcdc; text-align:center| Midfielders

|-
! colspan=16 style=background:#dcdcdc; text-align:center| Forwards

|-
! colspan=16 style=background:#dcdcdc; text-align:center| Players transferred out during the season

Last updated: 31 May 2019

Goalscorers

Last updated: 31 May 2019

Clean sheets

Last updated: 31 May 2019

Disciplinary record

Last updated: 31 May 2019

References

External links
Official website

Dynamo Kyiv
FC Dynamo Kyiv seasons
Dynamo Kyiv
Dynamo Kyiv